Schneider Trophy aircraft racing seaplanes which contested for the Schneider Trophy between 1913 and 1931.

See also

Schneider Trophy
Coupe Deutsch de la Meurthe
Gordon Bennett Trophy
Pulitzer Trophy Races

List of flying boats and floatplanes
List of racing aircraft

References

Notes

Citations

Bibliography

Schneider Trophy
Lists of aircraft by role